Sangeeta Puri (born 4 December 1979) is a former swimmer who competed in the Commonwealth and Olympic Games.

Career 

Puri represented Trinidad and Tobago in the 1993 Central American and Caribbean Games and won a gold medal in the 100m backstroke and a silver medal in the 200m backstroke.

She competed in the 1994 Commonwealth Games in the 50m freestyle, 100m backstroke and 100m butterfly.

Puri represented India at the 1996 Summer Olympic Games in the 50m freestyle and finished 48th out of 55 swimmers with a time of 28.02.

She attended Palisades Charter High School and set records in the 100-yard butterfly and 100-yard backstroke at the City Section swimming finals. Puri then swam for Princeton.

References

External links

1979 births
Living people
Indian female swimmers
Competitors at the 1993 Central American and Caribbean Games
Central American and Caribbean Games gold medalists for Trinidad and Tobago
Central American and Caribbean Games silver medalists for Trinidad and Tobago
Swimmers at the 1994 Commonwealth Games
Olympic swimmers of India
Swimmers at the 1996 Summer Olympics
Princeton University people
Central American and Caribbean Games medalists in swimming
Commonwealth Games competitors for Trinidad and Tobago